Orion Ruse is a 1984 role-playing game adventure for Star Trek: The Role Playing Game published by FASA.

Plot summary
Orion Ruse is an adventure set on the Orion trade world of Daros IV, in which the player characters seek a lucrative contract with a wealthy trading family.

Reception
Craig Sheeley reviewed Orion Ruse in Space Gamer No. 72. Sheeley commented that "If you like split-team adventures, if you want to get out of the starship combat/space adventure rut, if you really like to confuse and bamboozle your players, or if you'd like to get a playing group of Star Fleet personnel together with a playing group of merchants, then buy Orion Ruse."

R Jarnor reviewed Orion Ruse for White Dwarf #65, giving it an overall rating of 9 out of 10, and stated that "All in all it is pretty comprehensive, but nevertheless you will need to ad lib at various times."

References

Role-playing game supplements introduced in 1984
Star Trek: The Role Playing Game adventures